Chisocheton pentandrus subsp. paucijugus is a subspecies of Chisocheton pentandrus. It is a tree in the Meliaceae family. The specific epithet  is from the Latin meaning "few yokes", referring to the few leaflets.

Description
The fruits taper at each end.

Distribution and habitat
Chisocheton pentandrus is found in Thailand and Malesia. Its habitat is wetter forests.

References

pentandrus subsp. paucijugus
Plants described in 1979
Trees of Thailand
Trees of Malesia
Plant subspecies